The following is an incomplete list of artists who have released records on Razor & Tie and Razor & Tie imprints since the label was founded in 1990.

Former Razor & Tie artists 

16 Horsepower
40 Below Summer
Adestria
Al Stewart and Shot in the Dark
Alex Chilton
Andy McKee
Angelique Kidjo
Attila (independent)
Bad Books
Barbara Mandrell
BeBe Winans
Blood Youth
The Bongos
Born Cages
Brad
Brand New
A Bullet for Pretty Boy (Artery Recordings)
Bury Tomorrow (Nuclear Blast Records)
Capture the Crown
Casino Madrid (Artery Recordings)
César Velázquez
Chelsea Grin (Rise Records)
Cher Lloyd (Malaysia and Thailand)
Chiodos (disbanded) 
The Clarks
Cledus T. Judd
Corey Smith
The Crimson Armada (disbanded)
Crystal Lake
The Dan Band
Danko Jones
Dar Williams
Dave Barnes
Dave Stewart
Day of Fire
Dead Confederate
Deaf Havana
Death of an Era
Dee Snider
Defiler
Devin the Dude
DIVISIONS
Don Johnson
Donnie Iris
Early Seasons
Elliott Murphy
Emerson, Lake and Palmer (U.S. and Canada)
Endeverafter
Entheos
Enterprise Earth (Stay Sick)
Finch
For the Win
Four Letter Lie
Fronzilla
Gary U.S. Bonds
The Graduate
Graham Parker
Hearts & Hands
Hit the Lights
Horseneck
Hoods
Joe Grushecky
Hatebreed (Nuclear Blast Records)
I Am War
I Declare War
INVSN
It Lives, It Breathes (Stay Sick)
Ivory Joe Hunter
The Jingle Punks Hipster Orchestra
Joan Baez
Joe Jackson
John Lithgow
Jon McLaughlin
Jules Shear
Just Surrender
Kelly Sweet
Kevin Devine
Kubali Khan
Kyng
Ladysmith Black Mambazo
Laurie Berkner
Little Steven
Love Tractor
Madina Lake
Man Made Machine
Marshall Crenshaw
Mathias Anderle
Melinda Watts
Message to the Masses
Michael Londra
Neil Sedaka
Nicole Atkins
The Nields
Nikolai Baskov
Nonpoint
Norma Jean (Solid State Records)
Ocean is Theory
Old Again (Stay Sick)
Phillip LaRue
Phinehas
The Plot in You (Stay Sick)
P.O.D.
Prince Paul
Protest the Hero
The Ready Set
Richard Ashcroft
Rick Springfield
Ryan Shaw
Saves the Day
The Seeking
Selena Gomez
Semi Precious Weapons
Seven Nations
Slumber Party Girls
Shadows Fall
Shoot the Girl First
Silent Screams
Simon Collins
Sirens & Sailors
Slaves
Sonia Dada
Spoken
Steve Hofstetter
Stevie T.
Such Gold
The Summer Set
Suzanne Vega
Sworn In (Fearless Records)
Sylar (Hopeless Records)
Tina Sugandh
Upon this Dawning
Vanessa Carlton
Vanna (Pure Noise Records)
While She Sleeps (SharpTone Records)
White Fox Society
Wildways
Will Heaven
Willie Nile
Wounds
Yellowcard
Zappa Plays Zappa
Zendaya

Razor & Tie artists (as of May 2016)

All That Remains
Boonyi
Choo Choo Soul
Austin Plaine (Washington Square)
Devour the Day
Failure Anthem
HIM
Holy White Hounds
Kegan Kline
Kidz Bop
Kyng
The Low Anthem (Washington Square)
MAGIC GIANT (Washington Square)
MOTHXR (Washington Square)
Mount Holly
My Jerusalem (Washington Square)
Myka Relocate
The New Low
The Pretty Reckless (Fearless Records)
Red Sun Rising
Sons of Texas
Soren Bryce (Washington Square)
Starset
The Sword
The Vapors
The Wiggles
Wilson

Razor and Tie